Dmitry Vasilyevich Ageyev (21 February 1911 in Saint Petersburg, Russian Empire – 31 July 1997 in Nizhny Novgorod, Russia) was a Soviet and Russian scientist and educator in the field of radio engineering. He developed the theory of code division of signals during the radio reception, which is the basis for the construction of cellular networks on CDMA technology. Along with Vladimir Kotelnikov, he was one of the founders of the theory of optimum noise immunity that he developed throughout life, starting with a thesis at his institute.

Biography

Dmitry V. Ageyev was admitted to the Radio Engineering Faculty of the Leningrad Electrotechnical Institute of Communications (LEIS) in 1930, where he learnt from the scientists of his time, such as a founder of the national radio engineering and correspondent member of Academy of Sciences of the Soviet Union M. A. Bonch-Bruyevich, Professor Vladimir Tatarinov and others.

In 1934 he publishes an article with Y. B. Kobzarev “The Transition in the Resonance Amplifier”, which opened a new direction, the study of transients.

In 1935 he defended his dissertation “The Methods of Dealing with Noise in the Radio Reception”, which he wrote under the direction of M. A. Bonch-Bruyevich. The State Examination Commission appreciated the thesis. The results of his research paper became the basis for an article “The Fundamentals of the Linear Selection Theory”, which was used for his thesis “The Linear Methods of Selection and the Problem of the Ether’s Bandwidth”. The LEIS Scientific Council had no right to take the defense of doctoral dissertations, but they conferred a PhD degree on D. V. Ageyev, giving him the right to defend the dissertation as a doctoral. However, he did not want to use this work twice. He wrote and defended his doctoral dissertation “A New Method of Multi-Channel Wiring” in just one year. Ageyev proposed and investigated a new principle of multicast signals and their processing, which allowed reducing the influence of impulse noise.

References

1911 births
1997 deaths
Engineers from Saint Petersburg
Recipients of the Order of the Red Banner of Labour
Communication theorists
Soviet engineers